Pseudatteria cantharopa is a species of moth of the family Tortricidae. It is found in Bolivia and Peru.

The length of the forewings is 15–16 mm.

Subspecies
Pseudatteria cantharopa cantharopa (Bolivia)
Pseudatteria cantharopa pulchra Obraztsov, 1966 (Peru)

References

Moths described in 1909
Pseudatteria